Hemberg may refer to:

Places 
 Hemberg, St. Gallen, a town in St. Gallen, Switzerland
 Hemberg (ridge), a hill ridge in Hesse, Germany

People with the surname 
 Jöns Peter Hemberg, (1763-1864) Swedish banker and member of parliament
 Eugen Hemberg, (1845-1946) Swedish author and forester
 Eskil Hemberg, (1938-2004) Swedish composer and opera director
 Oscar Hemberg, (1881-1944) Swedish screenwriter, and newspaper editor
 Pawin von Hemberg (ca. 1350) knight in the Holy Roman Empire and Erbkämmerer to the archbishop of Cologne
 Christian Hemberg, (1981) Swedish former professional footballer
Elli Hemberg (1896- 1994) Swedish painter and sculptor